Halabezack is a hamlet that lies  west of Penryn in Cornwall, England.

References

Hamlets in Cornwall